The Universal Coverage scheme, also known as the gold card or 30-baht scheme, is the largest of the three Thai healthcare programmes that provide universal health care to the country's citizens. It covers the majority of the population, and is directly funded by the national budget and allocated on a mixed per-capita basis by the National Health Security Office (NHSO). The programme was launched in 2002 during the government of Prime Minister Thaksin Shinawatra, based on foundational developmental work by public-health civil servants, especially Doctor Sanguan Nitayarumphong, beginning in the 1980s.

At its launch, the programme required a copayment of 30 baht (approx. 1 US dollar) per visit, and it became widely known by that name. Thailand became one of the first few middle-income countries to implement universal healthcare, and the system was internationally praised and contributed greatly to Thaksin's political popularity.

The system has, since its original implementation, seen various modifications, including the removal of the 30 baht copayment (which happened following Thaksin's overthrow by coup in 2006) and the provision of direct access to antiretroviral therapy, haemodialysis and other chronic diseases. Further reforms are still being considered in order to address financial sustainability issues.

References

Healthcare in Thailand
Universal health care